The Granite Range,  el. , is a mountain range southwest of Absarokee, Montana in Stillwater County, Montana.

See also
 List of mountain ranges in Montana

Notes

Mountain ranges of Montana
Landforms of Stillwater County, Montana